Heart of the Rockies is a 1937 American Western "Three Mesquiteers" B-movie directed by Joseph Kane.

Cast
 Robert Livingston as Stony Brooke
 Ray Corrigan as Tucson Smith
 Max Terhune as Lullaby Joslin
 Lynne Roberts as Lorna Dawson (as Lynn Roberts)
 Sammy McKim as Davey Dawson (Ed's stepson)
 J. P. McGowan as Ed Dawson (head of Dawson clan)
 Yakima Canutt as Charlie Coe (Dawson henchman)
 Hal Taliaferro as Capt. Brady - Blackstone Park
 Maston Williams as Enoch Dawson, henchman
 Guy Wilkerson as Dawson clan member
 Ranny Weeks as Ranger Clayton

References

External links

1937 films
1937 Western (genre) films
American Western (genre) films
American black-and-white films
Films directed by Joseph Kane
Films produced by Sol C. Siegel
Republic Pictures films
Three Mesquiteers films
1930s English-language films
1930s American films